René Visse (22 October 1937 – 20 February 2020) was a French politician who served as a Deputy from Ardennes's 2nd constituency on behalf of the French Communist Party between 1978 and 1981.

References

1937 births
2020 deaths
Deputies of the 6th National Assembly of the French Fifth Republic
French Communist Party politicians
People from Ardennes (department)